The 1950 German football championship, the 40th edition of the competition, was the culmination of the 1949–50 football season in Germany. VfB Stuttgart won their first championship in a one-leg knock-out tournament. It was the third championship after the end of World War II.

VfB Stuttgart appeared in their second final, having lost to Schalke 04 in 1935. Losing finalists Kickers Offenbach appeared in a championship final for the first time.

For the first time 16 teams competed for the title, including the runners-up of the Berlin championship. However, East German side Union Oberschöneweide did not receive a travel permit, like SG Planitz two years earlier. Their players nevertheless traveled to Kiel to play Hamburger SV and eventually founded SC Union 06 Berlin. Originally, the first three teams from the DDR-Oberliga had been slated to appear in the championship, but the two football associations eventually could not agree on a mode of play and their places were given to West German Oberliga sides.

Qualified teams
The clubs qualified through the 1949–50 Oberliga season:

Competition

Round of 16

Replay

Quarter-finals

Semi-finals

Replay

Final

References

External links
 1949-50 at Weltfussball.de
 German championship 1950 at Fussballdaten.de

1949–50 in German football
German football championship seasons